Umberto Renica (8 April 1921 – 29 June 1975) was an Italian professional football player.

He played for 9 seasons (245 games, 38 goals) in the Serie A for A.S. Roma and Novara Calcio.

1921 births
1975 deaths
Italian footballers
Serie A players
Brescia Calcio players
Calcio Lecco 1912 players
A.S. Roma players
Como 1907 players
Novara F.C. players
Association football midfielders
Footballers from Bergamo